Euphaedra overlaeti is a butterfly in the family Nymphalidae. It is found in the Democratic Republic of the Congo (Shaba and Lualaba) and north-western Zambia.

References

Butterflies described in 1926
overlaeti